The 1956 United States presidential election in Oklahoma took place on November 6, 1956, as part of the 1956 United States presidential election. Voters chose eight representatives, or electors, to the Electoral College, who voted for president and vice president.

Oklahoma was won by incumbent President Dwight D. Eisenhower (R–Pennsylvania), running with Vice President Richard Nixon, with 55.13 percent of the popular vote, against Adlai Stevenson (D–Illinois), running with Senator Estes Kefauver, with 44.87 percent of the popular vote. As of 2020, this is the last time Oklahoma has voted more Democratic than the nation as a whole.

Results

Results by county

See also
 United States presidential elections in Oklahoma

References

Oklahoma
1956
1956 Oklahoma elections